Bettembos is a commune in the Somme department in Hauts-de-France in northern France.

Etymology of the commune’s name
Betembos (1154), Betemboiz (1177), Betthembos (1206), Bedembos (1337), Bethembos (1349), Bettembos (1483), Betembo (1648), Betenbos (1710), Betenbo (1733), Bettenbos (1750), Betanbo (1778).

Geography

Population

See also
Communes of the Somme department

References

Communes of Somme (department)